Legendary Ventures is an American venture capital firm focused on investing in consumer, retail, and technology companies.  One of the company’s major investments includes the aerospace company SpaceX.

History 
Legendary Ventures was founded in 2012 by Jamie Driver, co-founder of Morpheus Media and Jayson Kim, formerly with J.Crew Group. 

In 2020, Legendary Ventures also invested in ToyBox Labs, a 3D printer manufacturing company for kids that appeared on the reality television series Shark Tank.

Legendary Ventures made a major investment in aerospace company SpaceX in 2020.

Philanthropy 
In December 2020, Legendary Ventures joined the Girl Scouts of the USA’s corporate partnership program.

Investments 
Legendary Ventures’ notable investments include:

 AdTheorent
 Bevite
 Fiscal Note
 Gemist
 Posture360
 Pinterest
 Snorble
 SpaceX
 ToyBox Labs
 Vrai

References 

Venture capital firms
2012 establishments in New York City
Financial services companies established in 2012
Privately held companies based in New York City